Matěj Rejsek or Matthias Rejsek (around 1445, Prostějov – 1 July 1506, Kutná Hora) was a Czech stonemason, sculptor, builder and architect of the Late Gothic style.

Life

Matěj Rejsek was born probably in 1445 in Prostějov (either in Bohemian Prostějov or in Moravian Prostějov). As a young man he came to Prague to study at the Faculty of Arts at the Charles University in Prague. He finished his studies in 1469 as a bachelor and became the rector and teacher at the parish school of the Church of Our Lady before Týn in the Old Town of Prague.

He built some houses in Prague. One of his most famous works is the Powder Tower which was built as a representative gate of the Old Town of Prague after 1475. Matěj Rejsek became the main builder of the tower in 1478. His work was inspired by Petr Parler's work.

In 1489 he moved to Kutná Hora where he worked at the completion of the St. Barbara's Church. Rejsek began to build the outer supporting system, triforium and vaulting. The net vault of the presbytery was completed in 1499.

He died on 1 July 1506 in Kutná Hora and was buried in the St. Barbara's Church.

Works
 Marble tomb for utraquist Bishop Jan Rokycana in the Church of Our Lady before Týn in the Old Town of Prague (1470) – not preserved
 Funeral baldachin for Italian Catholic Bishop Augustine Lucian of Mirandola in the Church of Our Lady before Týn
 Powder Gate in Prague, statues and decoration cut in sandstone (1478–1483)
 Upper part of triforium and vault of choir of St. Barbara's Church, Kutná Hora (1489–1506)
 Pulpit in the St. Lawrence Church in Kaňk near Kutná Hora (1504) 
 Pulpit with statues of four signs of evangelists, in the St. Batholomew Church in Rakovník in Central Bohemia (1504)
 Town Hall in Kutná Hora (after 1490) – not preserved

Probably created by Matěj Rejsek:
 Statue of a mythic knight Bruncvík with a lion (Roland statue) at the Charles Bridge in the Lesser Town of Prague, damaged in 1648, since 1875 placed in the Lapidarium of the National Museum in Prague
 Stone fountain in Kutná Hora (1495)

References

Literature
Michaela OTTOVÁ: Pod ochranou Krista Spasitele a svaté Barbory. Sochařská výzdoba kostela sv. Barbory v Kutné Hoře (1483–1499). Praha 2010

1445 births
1506 deaths
People from Prostějov
Czech architects
Gothic architects
Charles University alumni